Paula Elizabeth Jameson  is a New Zealand plant physiologist.

Biography 
In1982 Jameson was awarded a PhD titled  'A study on the role of cytokinins in the development of starch accumulating structures''' from the University of Canterbury. After working at Otago University and serving as head of department at Massey University, Jameson moved to the  University of Canterbury. Jameson is a Fellow of the New Zealand Institute of Agricultural and Horticultural Science and a life member of the New Zealand Society of Plant Physiologists.

 Research 
Jameson's work on the genetics of large-seed production has received international coverage. In the 1980s, Jameson gave evidence of her research findings in a controversial case involving the fertiliser Maxicrop. Fertiliser company Bell-Booth Ltd contended that Jameson was on the verge of a major breakthrough of great significance to New Zealand. However, Jameson's results were challenged by international scientists appearing for the Ministry of Agriculture and Forestry (New Zealand), who determined that the fertiliser would have to be applied at the rate of 98,000 litres/ha to elicit a response. The case was decided against the Ministry because even though the product was likely worthless, no legal basis existed to prevent its marketing. Interviewed later about the case, Jameson said that she
was not keen to revisit "ancient history [and the case] taught me to stand on my own two feet and taught me who my friends were."

 Honours and awards 
In 2019, Professor Jameson was awarded the Marsden Medal by the New Zealand Association of Scientists for her work on plant cytokinins, among other work, over her extraordinary scientific career.

In the 2021 Queen's Birthday Honours, Jameson was appointed an Officer of the New Zealand Order of Merit, for services to plant science.

Selected works
 Controlled cytokinin production in transgenic tobacco using a copper-inducible promoter MJ McKenzie, V Mett, PHS Reynolds and PE Jameson Plant Physiology 116 (3), 969–977. 1998
 Cytokinins and auxins in plant-pathogen interactions–an overview PE Jameson Plant Growth Regulation 32 (2-3), 369–380. 2000
 Changes in the activities of antioxidant enzymes in response to virus infection and hormone treatment'' SF Clarke, PL Guy, DJ Burritt, PE Jameson Physiologia Plantarum 114 (2), 157–164. 2002

References

External links
 
 

Living people
Plant physiologists
20th-century New Zealand botanists
New Zealand women academics
Academic staff of the Massey University
University of Canterbury alumni
Academic staff of the University of Canterbury
Academic staff of the University of Otago
20th-century New Zealand women scientists
Year of birth missing (living people)
New Zealand women botanists
New Zealand women writers
Officers of the New Zealand Order of Merit
21st-century New Zealand botanists
21st-century New Zealand women scientists